The Morpeth To Newcastle Road Race (short The Morpeth) was the oldest road running event in England, United Kingdom and was traditionally run on New Year's Day from Morpeth to Newcastle-upon-Tyne.

History

Only in 2002 was the road race standardised to the half-marathon distance.

In 2002 the sponsor pulled out and finance for safety precautions became a serious issue for the host club Morpeth Harriers. The race was moved away from its traditional New Year's Day slot to the second Sunday in January. The last official Morpeth was run in its centenary Year of 2004.

Ultimately the race was cancelled in 2005 and 2006 as safety issues could not be resolved with the local authorities. 

In particular the police, who proposed a new route via Dinnington (which was met with much resistance from the current organisers).

At present, Morpeth Harriers host an 11k road race on New Year's Day in which there are over 100 competitors.

In 2016 a new race called Morpeth 2 Newcastle incorporating a marathon and a half marathon took place on 30 October.

Winners

The title of most victories belongs to that of Dunky Wright who scored seven wins. North-East based athlete Jim Alder who represented Scotland in the 1966 Kingston Commonwealth Games and won a Gold medal in the marathon has also claimed five victories in this event.

Morpeth to Newcastle Marathon (2016–).

North Tyneside to Newcastle Half Marathon (2016–).

Over Half Marathon distance (2002–2004).

Over 22.7 km course (1983–2001).

External links 

 Official website of Morpeth 2 Newcastle
 Morpeth to Newcastle at the ARRS

References

Long-distance running competitions
Sport in Newcastle upon Tyne
Sport in Northumberland
Athletics competitions in England
Road running competitions
Road running in the United Kingdom
1904 establishments in England
Recurring sporting events established in 1904
Annual sporting events in the United Kingdom
Annual events in England